The Pic de Ger is a French Pyrenean summit, culminating at , located in the Ossau Valley in the Béarn province.

Toponymy 
The name ger means "mountain meadows" in Gascon.

Topography 
It lies between the Col d'Aubisque and the Pic du Midi d'Ossau.

Access 
From Laruns, or further up from Eaux-Bonnes or Gourette.

Legend of Clara "la Dame au Châle" 

It is told in the Ger and in the Col d'Aubisque, that a very old woman named Clara was taken by surprise above  by the cold and snowy weather, only wearing a thick shawl with a walking stick. She was surprised by a bear, also in despair. The frightened bear fled. This moment of local history, surely inspired by an unsourced true tale, is still carved in the rock. In fact, under the summit of the Pic de Ger, the hole still exists, while at the bottom the face of the woman with her shawl and chapped lips.

Mountains of the Pyrenees
Mountains of Pyrénées-Atlantiques
Two-thousanders of France